Christian Fischer (born April 15, 1997) is an American professional ice hockey forward who is an alternate captain for the Arizona Coyotes of the National Hockey League (NHL). He was drafted by the Coyotes, 32nd overall, in the 2015 NHL Entry Draft.

Playing career
Fischer played his juniors leagues with Chicago Mission Bantam AAA, Chicago Mission Midget AAA, and Chicago Mission U16, registering 44 goals and 95 points in a total of 77 games in the 3 seasons. He was selected in the 11th Round of the 2013 OHL Priority Selection, however he was not signed.

After that, he played in the USA Hockey National Team Development Program, and played with the USA U17 hockey team. The following season he competed with the U18 and the Junior Team again and was selected 32nd overall by Arizona in the 2015 NHL Entry Draft. On March 5, 2015, Fischer scored the fastest goal in USHL history, scoring six seconds into a game against the Omaha Lancers.

On August 20, 2015, Fischer was signed to a three-year entry-level contract with the Arizona Coyotes. On August 24 Fischer came to terms in continuing his junior career with the Windsor Spitfires of the OHL, who previously drafted him in 2013.

After completing his rookie campaign with the Spitfires in 2015–16, Fischer continued his year by signing an amateur try-out contract with the Coyotes' AHL affiliate, the Springfield Falcons on April 7, 2016. He made his professional debut with the Falcons, finishing with 3 points in 6 games. On January 21, 2017, he was called up to the Arizona Coyotes and played in his NHL debut against the Tampa Bay Lightning. With just over two minutes left in the second period, Fischer scored his first NHL goal from a feed from teammates Jamie McGinn and Alexander Burmistrov in a 5–3 victory.

Fischer then spent the entirety of the 2017–18 season with the Coyotes in the NHL, finishing his rookie campaign with 33 points in 79 games. Following his rookie season, Fischer was named to the Coyotes opening night roster for the 2018–19 season. Fischer recorded his first career NHL hat trick on October 23, in a 4–1 win over the Columbus Blue Jackets.

On October 28, 2022, in the 1st period, Fischer scored the first NHL goal in the Mullett Arena, the temporary home of the Arizona Coyotes which is shared by the ASU Sun Devils. Later in the period, he scored the second goal in Mullett Arena.

International play
Fischer represented the United States by playing on the National U17 Team in January 2014, and the National U18 Team in 2015, winning 2 gold medals and adding 3 goals and 11 assists in the 2 tournaments.

Personal life
Fischer resides in Scottsdale, Arizona year-round. His favorite hobbies include golf, listening to the musical artist Drake (musician) and going to the movies.  In the summer of 2022, Fischer officiated his sister's wedding in Wisconsin.

Career statistics

Regular season and playoffs

International

Records
 Fastest USHL goal in history (6 seconds in game)

References

External links

1997 births
Living people
Arizona Coyotes draft picks
Arizona Coyotes players
American men's ice hockey right wingers
Ice hockey people from Chicago
Springfield Falcons players
Tucson Roadrunners players
USA Hockey National Team Development Program players
Windsor Spitfires players